14th AFCA Awards

Best Film: 
If Beale Street Could Talk

The 14th Austin Film Critics Association Awards, honoring the best in filmmaking for 2018, were announced on January 8, 2019.

Winners and nominees

References

External links
 Official website

2018 film awards
2018
2018 in Texas